Donna Stark is an American Country singer who recorded in the 1970s and 1980s and succeeded in reaching the Billboard Country Charts with the singles "Why Don't You Believe Me" and "Next 100 Years".

Career
Her first 2 singles were "Set Me Free" and "Echoes of the Past" which received limited airplay.

After recording for several years, she entered the Billboard Country Charts in 1979 at No. 92 with the song "Why Don't You Believe Me", her biggest hit. Her next and final charting song was the lead single and title track to her 1980 album, "Next 100 Years", which peaked at #102.

Discography
Singles:
RCI Records
1976 "Set Me Free" (7", Single)
1976 "Echoes of the Past" (7", Single, Promo)
1978 "I Wanna Be With You" (7", Single)
1978 "Walking Away/Fascinating Stranger" (7", Single)
1979 "Why Don't You Believe Me" (7", Single, Promo) US Country #92
1980 "The Next 100 Years" (7", Single, Promo) US Country #105
Thomas Records
1978 "What Does It Take (To Keep A Man Like You Satisfied)" (7", Single, Promo)
Albums:
RCI Records
1980 "The Next 100 Years" (LP)

See also
List of people from The Bronx

References

Living people
Musicians from the Bronx
American women singers
Year of birth missing (living people)
21st-century American women